Podalia orsilochus is a moth of the Megalopygidae family. It was described by Pieter Cramer in 1775. It is found in Mexico, Costa Rica, Brazil, Guyana and Venezuela.

The wingspan is 65 mm. The forewings are white, the markings light olivaceous brown. There is a small black spot at the base below the median and a broad median shade, darkest along the upper portion of the cell, crossed by whitish shades between the veins and limited by a broad white post-medial line, which is followed by cuneiform streaks and spots. There is also a terminal row of spots between the veins. The hindwings are white, the space below the cell and inner margin shaded with olivaceous brown. There are also some faint terminal spots.

References

External links
 Matías N.Sánchez et al.: Understanding toxicological implications of accidents with caterpillars Megalopyge lanata and Podalia orsilochus (Lepidoptera: Megalopygidae). In: Comparative Biochemistry and Physiology Part C: Toxicology & Pharmacology; Volume 216, February 2019, Pages 110-119; doi:10.1016/j.cbpc.2018.11.011

Moths described in 1775
Megalopygidae
Taxa named by Pieter Cramer